The Union of Evangelical Christian Baptists of Kazakhstan is a national fellowship of Baptist churches, also known as the Union of Evangelical Christians-Baptists. The Union is composed of 256 churches and 252 communities with 9,187 members.

See also
 Brotherhood of Independent Baptist Churches and Ministries of Ukraine
 Evangelical Baptist Union of Ukraine
 Russian Union of Evangelical Christians-Baptists

Protestantism in Kazakhstan
Christian organizations established in 1992
Baptist denominations in Asia
Baptist denominations established in the 20th century
Free Will Baptists